Kim Sung-Kil (born July 8, 1983) is a footballer who played in South Korea and Australia. Kim previously played for Japanese side Oita Trinita. He also played for Ulsan Hyundai Horang-i, Gwangju Sangmu Bulsajo and Gyeongnam FC in the K-League.

Club honours
At Gyeongnam FC
 League Cup third place: 1
 2006
 Korean FA Cup runner-up: 1
 2008

References

 

1983 births
Living people
South Korean footballers
South Korean expatriate footballers
Oita Trinita players
Ulsan Hyundai FC players
Gimcheon Sangmu FC players
Gyeongnam FC players
Gold Coast United FC players
J1 League players
J2 League players
K League 1 players
Korea National League players
A-League Men players
Expatriate footballers in Japan
South Korean expatriate sportspeople in Japan
Expatriate soccer players in Australia
South Korean expatriate sportspeople in Australia
Association football midfielders